Richard Eliot  (1694–1748), of St. Giles-in-the-Fields, Middlesex, was a British diplomat, official and politician who sat in the House of Commons from 1733 to 1748.
 
Eliot was baptized on 28 October 1694, the second son of William Eliot. He matriculated at Balliol College, Oxford in 1712. He was appointed secretary of the Embassy to Lord Carteret in Sweden in 1719, receiving £200 p.a. with no extraordinaries as he was to live with the ambassador.  After the death of his brother Edward Eliot  in 1722, he managed the estates and parliamentary interest of his young nephew James Eliot at Port Eliot, whom he succeeded in 1742. In 1722, he was appointed Commissioner of excise. He married Harriot, illegitimate daughter of James Craggs and the actress Hester Santlow on 10 March 1726. After he ceased to be Commissioner of Excise in May 1729, he was appointed surveyor general of the Duchy of Cornwall in January 1730.
 
Eliot was returned as Member of Parliament for St Germans at a by-election on 29 January 1733. He voted with the Administration on the Excise Bill in 1733 and the repeal of the Septennial Act in 1734.  At the 1734 British general election he was returned as MP for Liskeard. In 1738 he went into opposition with the Prince of Wales and his post was exchanged for that of Receiver General of the Duchy. He voted against the Spanish convention in 1739, and for the place bill in 1740. He withdrew on the motion to dismiss Walpole in February 1741. At the 1741, he was returned again for Liskeard.  He continued to act with the Prince of Wales's party, voting against the Administration on the chairman of the elections committee in December 1741. He was mayor of Liskeard for the year 1741 to 1742.  After the fall of Walpole in 1742 he went over to the Administration.  He was Mayor of Liskeard again for 1746 to 1747.  In 1747, he reverted to opposition with the Prince again. At the 1747 British general election, he was returned again for St Germans.

Eliot died on 19 November 1748 leaving three sons and six daughters including Edward Craggs-Eliot, 1st Baron Eliot.  He was in financial difficulties which were caused according to his wife by his Duchy office, which had cost him ‘£7,000 and contributed to his death. Harriot married secondly in 1749 John Hamilton, by whom she had a son, John Hamilton, 1st Marquess of Abercorn.

References

1694 births
1748 deaths
Members of the Parliament of Great Britain for St Germans
British MPs 1727–1734
British MPs 1734–1741
British MPs 1741–1747
British MPs 1747–1754
Members of the Parliament of Great Britain for Liskeard